Apatelodes pithala is a moth in the family Apatelodidae. It is commonly found in the Mexican state of Guerrero.

References

Natural History Museum Lepidoptera generic names catalog

Apatelodidae
Moths described in 1921